NFL Quarterback Club '99, released in November 1998, developed by Iguana Entertainment and published by Acclaim Entertainment for Nintendo 64.

Gameplay
The title is one of the first sports games to work with the Expansion Pak. The game features the ability to replay past Super Bowls and provides historical descriptions of them. NFL Quarterback Club '99 delivers all 31 teams and 3D rendered stadiums (also included are the Cleveland Browns). 1,500 players are featured in the game with over 250 motion-capture animations. Players, along with teams, uniforms, coaches, and playbooks can also be created and used in game.

The game features teams from NFL Europe.

Development
As with the preceding game in the series, NFL Quarterback Club 98, Brett Favre served as the game's spokesman and cover player. Play-by-play was handled by Mike Patrick, color calls by Randy Cross and referee calls by Jerry Markbreit. Charlie Weis and Dedric Ward served as consultants for the game.

Reception

NFL Quarterback Club 99 received favorable reviews according to the review aggregation website GameRankings.

The game was a finalist for the Academy of Interactive Arts & Sciences' 1998 "Sports Game of the Year" and "Outstanding Achievement in Software Engineering" awards, both of which went to 1080° Snowboarding and Metal Gear Solid, respectively.

References

External links

1998 video games
NFL Quarterback Club
Nintendo 64 games
Nintendo 64-only games
Acclaim Entertainment games
Video games developed in the United States